The Great Indoors may refer to:
The Great Indoors (department store)
The Great Indoors (TV series)
"The Great Indoors", an episode of season 3 of Phineas and Ferb

See also
The Great Outdoors (disambiguation)